Volvox is a polyphyletic genus of chlorophyte green algae in the family Volvocaceae. It forms spherical colonies of up to 50,000 cells. They live in a variety of freshwater habitats, and were first reported by Antonie van Leeuwenhoek in 1700.

Description 

Volvox is a polyphyletic genus in the volvocine green algae clade. Each mature Volvox colony is composed of up to thousands of cells from two differentiated cell types: numerous flagellate somatic cells and a smaller number of germ cells lacking in soma that are embedded in the surface of a hollow sphere or coenobium containing an extracellular matrix made of glycoproteins.

Adult somatic cells comprise a single layer with the flagella facing outward. The cells swim in a coordinated fashion, with distinct anterior and posterior poles. The cells have anterior eyespots that enable the colony to swim toward light. The cells of colonies in the more basal Euvolvox clade are interconnected by thin strands of cytoplasm, called protoplasmates. Cell number is specified during development and is dependent on the number of rounds of division.

Reproduction 

Volvox is facultatively sexual and can reproduce both sexually and asexually. In the lab, asexual reproduction is most commonly observed; the relative frequencies of sexual and asexual reproduction in the wild is unknown. The switch from asexual to sexual reproduction can be triggered by environmental conditions and by the production of a sex-inducing pheromone. Desiccation-resistant diploid zygotes are produced following successful fertilization.

An asexual colony includes both somatic (vegetative) cells, which do not reproduce, and large, non-motile gonidia in the interior, which produce new colonies asexually through repeated division. In sexual reproduction two types of gametes are produced. Volvox species can be monoecious or dioecious. Male colonies release numerous sperm packets, while in female colonies single cells enlarge to become oogametes, or eggs.

Kirk and Kirk showed that sex-inducing pheromone production can be triggered in somatic cells by a short heat shock given to asexually growing organisms. The induction of sex by heat shock is mediated by oxidative stress that likely also causes oxidative DNA damage. It has been suggested that switching to the sexual pathway is the key to surviving environmental stresses that include heat and drought. Consistent with this idea, the induction of sex involves a signal transduction pathway that is also induced in Volvox by wounding.

Colony inversion 
Colony inversion is a special characteristic during development in the order Volvocaceae that results in new colonies having their flagella facing outwards. During this process the asexual reproductive cells (gonidia) first undergo successive cell divisions to form a concave-to-cup-shaped embryo or plakea composed of a single cell layer. Immediately after, the cell layer is inside out compared with the adult configuration—the apical ends of the embryo protoplasts from which flagella are formed, are oriented toward the interior of the plakea. Then the embryo undergoes inversion, during which the cell layer inverts to form a spheroidal daughter colony with the apical ends and flagella of daughter protoplasts positioned outside. This process enables appropriate locomotion of spheroidal colonies of the Volvocaceae. The mechanism of inversion has been investigated extensively at the cellular and molecular levels using the model species, Volvox carteri.

Habitats 
Volvox is a genus of freshwater algae found in ponds and ditches, even in shallow puddles. According to Charles Joseph Chamberlain,
"The most favorable place to look for it is in the deeper ponds, lagoons, and ditches which receive an abundance of rain water. It has been said that where you find Lemna, you are likely to find Volvox; and it is true that such water is favorable, but the shading is unfavorable. Look where you find Sphagnum, Vaucheria, Alisma, Equisetum fluviatile, Utricularia, Typha, and Chara. Dr. Nieuwland reports that Pandorina, Eudorina and Gonium are commonly found as constituents of the green scum on wallows in fields where pigs are kept. The flagellate, Euglena, is often associated with these forms."

History 
Antonie van Leeuwenhoek first reported observations of Volvox in 1700.

After some drawings of Henry Baker (1753), Linnaeus (1758) would describe the genus Volvox, with two species: V. globator and V. chaos. Volvox chaos is an amoeba now known as Chaos (genus) sp.

Evolution 
Ancestors of Volvox transitioned from single cells to form multicellular colonies at least , during the Triassic period. An estimate using DNA sequences from about 45 different species of volvocine green algae, including Volvox, suggests that the transition from single cells to undifferentiated multicellular colonies took about 35 million years.

References

External links 

 
 Volvox description with pictures from a Hosei University website
 YouTube videos of Volvox:
 Volvox micro-motility in Lake Oroville, CA
 Life cycle and inversion
 Waltzing Volvox
 Spinning Volvox
 Volvox, one of the 7 Wonders of the Micro World by Wim van Egmond, from Microscopy-UK
 Volvox carteri at MetaMicrobe.com, with modes of reproduction, brief facts

1700 in science
Chlamydomonadales
Chlamydomonadales genera